Fern Creek is a stream in Alberta, Canada.

Fern Creek was so named on account of ferns near its banks.

See also
List of rivers of Alberta

References

Rivers of Alberta